"Good Clean Fun" is a song by The Monkees from their 1969 album The Monkees Present. Recorded on June 1, 1968, it was released on Colgems single #5005 on September 6, 1969. Written and sung by Michael Nesmith, the song's title is never heard in the lyrics.

Background
At the time of release, The Monkees were a trio consisting of Micky Dolenz, Michael Nesmith and Davy Jones, Peter Tork having departed in December 1968.

Chart performance
"Good Clean Fun" reached No. 82 on the Billboard Hot 100 and No. 29 on the Easy Listening chart. In Canada it reached No. 80  The flip-side, "Mommy and Daddy", is sung by its writer Micky Dolenz.

References

Additional sources
Joel Whitburn's Billboard Top Pop Hits
Rhino's "Present" CD booklet

1969 songs
The Monkees songs
Songs written by Michael Nesmith